Fernando Ribeiro Fernandes (born July 16, 1986 in Goiânia), known as Fernando, is a Brazilian football attacking midfielder. He currently plays for Cuiabá.

Career
Fernando joined Flamengo in August 2008, after playing ten Campeonato Brasileiro Série C games for Mixto, in which he scored ten goals.

Flamengo career statistics
(Correct  October 23, 2008)

according to combined sources on the.

Honours 
Mixto
 Campeonato Mato-Grossense: 2008

Santo André
 Campeonato Paulista Série A2: 2016

Cuiabá
 Campeonato Mato-Grossense: 2017

References

External links
CBF

1986 births
Living people
Brazilian footballers
Sportspeople from Goiânia
Campeonato Brasileiro Série A players
Campeonato Brasileiro Série B players
Campeonato Brasileiro Série C players
Mixto Esporte Clube players
CR Flamengo footballers
Volta Redonda FC players
Atlético Clube Goianiense players
Vila Nova Futebol Clube players
Luverdense Esporte Clube players
Cuiabá Esporte Clube players
Clube de Regatas Brasil players
Esporte Clube Santo André players
Association football midfielders